This is a list of the Wardens and Chairs of the Regional Municipality of Peel, Ontario an administrative area located west of Toronto.

References

External links
 

Regional Municipality of Peel